The St. Mary's Monastery, also known as the Monastery of Dormition of Theotokos Mary, is a medieval Byzantine church in Zvërnec Island inside the Narta Lagoon northwest of the city of Vlorë of Southern Albania.

See also   
 Culture of Albania
 Architecture of Albania
 Byzantine churches in Albania

References 

 

13th-century Eastern Orthodox church buildings
14th-century Eastern Orthodox church buildings
Cultural Monuments of Albania
Churches in Vlorë County 
Tourist attractions in Vlorë County 
Byzantine church buildings in Albania
Eastern Orthodox church buildings in Albania